IPSC Moldova is the Moldovan association for practical shooting under the International Practical Shooting Confederation.

External links 
 Official homepage of IPSC Moldova

References 

Regions of the International Practical Shooting Confederation
Sports organizations of Moldova